Aquarius Records was an independent record store in San Francisco, California, established in 1970. Aquarius was known for carrying an obscure selection of psychedelia, metal, and world music, and had an extensive mail order catalog. The store's selection was relatively small and was chosen and annotated by the staff of music aficionados. They claimed to have coined the modern alias dronology for the drone music genre. It is the subject of the documentary "It Came From Aquarius Records" that premiered as part of the 2022 San Francisco Documentary Festival.

History

The first Aquarius Records store was located in the Castro area of San Francisco.  The first store was on 19th Street, followed by two locations on Castro Street, including one next door to Harvey Milk's camera store. Chris Knab bought the store in 1972 and in 1978, he co-founded the independent punk rock and new wave music record label, 415 Records, with Harvey Milk's friend  and his, Howie Klein.  Around 1983, the store moved to 3961 24th Street, in Noe Valley. In 1996, new owner Windy Chien moved the store to 1055 Valencia Street in the Mission District. Aquarius Records closed its doors in 2016.

Notes

External links
 Official homepage of Aquarius Records (Archive.org copy of June 2016)
 History of Aquarius Records
 Aquarius Records' page on StylusCity

Music retailers of the United States
Independent stores
Retail companies established in 1970
Mission District, San Francisco
Companies based in San Francisco
1970 establishments in California